The 2021 Open Sopra Steria de Lyon was a professional tennis tournament played on clay courts. It was the 5th edition of the tournament which was part of the 2021 ATP Challenger Tour. It took place in Lyon, France, between 7 and 13 June 2021.

Singles main-draw entrants

Seeds

 1 Rankings are as of 31 May 2021.

Other entrants
The following players received wildcards into the singles main draw:
  Titouan Droguet
  Kyrian Jacquet
  Matteo Martineau

The following player received entry into the singles main draw as a special exempt:
  Holger Rune

The following players received entry from the qualifying draw:
  Pedro Cachín
  Manuel Guinard
  Camilo Ugo Carabelli
  Alexey Vatutin

The following players received entry as lucky losers:
  Michael Geerts
  Laurent Lokoli

Champions

Singles

 Pablo Cuevas def.  Elias Ymer 6–2, 6–2.

Doubles

 Martín Cuevas /  Pablo Cuevas def.  Tristan Lamasine /  Albano Olivetti 6–3, 7–6(7–2).

References

2021 ATP Challenger Tour
2021
2021 in French tennis
June 2021 sports events in France